Blues Caravan is a 1962 studio album by Buddy Rich and a sextet. Rich later took this sextet on a United States Department of State tour of the Far East and Asia.

Track listing
LP side A
"Blowin' the Blues Away" (Horace Silver) – 8:40
"B.R. Blues" (Buddy Rich) – 3:14
"Late Date" (Maynard) – 5:12
LP side B
"Caravan" (Duke Ellington, Irving Mills, Juan Tizol) – 9:44
"Young Blood" (Mike Mainieri) – 5:59
"I Remember Clifford" (Benny Golson) – 3:35

Personnel
Wyatt Ruther - double bass
Buddy Rich - drums
Sam Most - flute
Johnny Morris - piano
Rolf Ericson - trumpet
Mike Mainieri - vibraphone
Production
Creed Taylor - audio production
Roy de Carava - cover photo
Dick Olmstead - engineer
Ken Druker - executive producer
Dom Cerulli - liner notes
Hollis King - reissue art director
Sherniece Smith
Kip Smith - reissue mastering
Bryan Koniarz - reissue producer

References

Verve V/V6 8425 (mono/stereo)

1962 albums
Buddy Rich albums
Albums produced by Creed Taylor
Verve Records albums